Gongzi Docing (Cantonese 公子多情 Loving Prince) is the third studio album of cantopop singer Prudence Liew, released in October 1988.

Album information
This album contains less covers than her previous album, Why; however two of the three covers made it as singles.  The title track and lead single "公子多情 Loving Prince" is actually a Chinese song from 1965 albeit with updated lyrics written by Liew herself.  The second single is "一見鍾情 Love at First Sight", a cover of the Tiffany song "I Saw Him Standing There", which in itself was a cover of the 1963 Beatles tune, "I Saw Her Standing There".  The track "討厭 Annoying" is a cover version of Fairground Attraction's song "Perfect".

The third single to release from the album is "廣播道神話 The Legend of Broadcast Drive".  It is a song about Broadcast Drive in Kowloon, which at the time was home to four of Hong Kong's media outlets: Radio Television Hong Kong (RTHK), Television Broadcasts Limited (TVB), Asia Television (ATV), and Commercial Radio Hong Kong (CRHK).

Track listing

References

1988 albums
Prudence Liew albums